Aoba or AOBA may refer to:

Places
Aoba-ku, Sendai
Aoba-ku, Yokohama
Aoba-dōri Station
Aoba Island, also known as Ambae, Vanuatu

People
Aoba (surname)

Organizations
American Osteopathic Board of Anesthesiology

Astronomy
4292 Aoba, an asteroid.

Other
Japanese cruiser Aoba
Aoba (train), the name of a train service in Japan
Green perilla

it:Ninja del Villaggio della Foglia#Aoba Yamashiro